Armodios "Aris" C. Vovos (Greek: Αρμόδιος "Άρης" Βωβός; born 21 October 1964) is a Greek businessman. The family business Babis Vovos Constructions filed for bankruptcy protection in 2015. Vovos is a rally driver and was president of Maroussi Basketball Club.

Rally driver
Vovos was the first Greek finisher in the Acropolis Rally in 1994. In 1995 he won the rally with Kostas Stefanis as his co-driver; the race was not a World Championship event that year. He scored three points in the 1994 World Rally Championship season and 1 point in the 2004 World Rally Championship season. He also competed in 2005, 2006, and 2007. He also won the Greek Rally Championship in 1995 driving a Lancia Delta, in 1997 with a Subaru Impreza WRC, in 2000 with Toyota Corolla WRC in 2001 with a Subaru Impreza WRC, and in 2009 and 2010 with Mitsubishi Lancer EVO IX (in group N).

From 2002 to 2008, he participated in events in Greece and abroad, along with "EL-EM" (Loris Meletopoulos) as his co-driver.

Racing awards 

Greek Rally Championship:

1995 (1st)
1997 (1st)
2000 (1st)
2001 (1st)
2009 (1st)
2010 (1st)

Greek Gravel Cup:

2004 (Winner)
2005 (Winner)

Acropolis Rally:

1994 (Best Greek Driver) 8 Overall
1995 (1st place in General)
1997 (Best Greek Driver) 9 Overall
2004 (Best Greek Driver) 8 Overall
2005 (Best Greek Driver) 12 Overall
2006 (Best Greek Driver) 15 Overall
2007 (Best Greek Driver) 13 Overall

Personal
Vovos is married to Vicky Lagopoulou and they have one daughter. He is the son of Greek businessman Babis Vovos.

See also
Babis Vovos Constructions

External links
BVIC Official Company Site /
 Site] /
Acropolis Rally
Profile of Aris Vovos@www.rally.gr 
Maroussi BC Home Page 
Rally.gr 

1964 births
Living people
Greek businesspeople
Greek rally drivers
World Rally Championship drivers